Demetrio Ortiz (Piribebuy, 22 December 1916 – Buenos Aires, 18 August 1975) was a Paraguayan musician.

References

1916 births
1975 deaths
People from Piribebuy
Paraguayan people of Spanish descent
Paraguayan musicians